Thanh Bình is a ward located in Biên Hòa city of Đồng Nai province, Vietnam. It has an area of about 0.35km2 and the population in 2018 was 5,360.

It is the smallest ward in Biên Hòa by area.

References

Bien Hoa